Igembe Central is a constituency in Kenya. It is one of nine constituencies in Meru County.

References 

Constituencies in Meru County